Myles Murphy may refer to:
 Myles Murphy (painter) (1927–2016), English painter
 Myles Murphy (American football) (born 2002), American football player

See also
 Miles Murphy (born 1967), Australian sprinter